Anne Murray: Full Circle is a Canadian documentary film, directed by Adrian Buitenhuis and Morgan Elliott and released in 2021. The film is a portrait of Canadian singer Anne Murray, including both contemporary interview footage of Murray reflecting on her career and previously unseen archival footage.

Other figures appearing in the film to discuss Murray and her career include Shania Twain, Kenny Loggins, Bonnie Raitt, k.d. lang, Jann Arden, Bruce Allen and Gordon Lightfoot.

The film received an exclusive one-night theatrical screening at selected Cineplex theatres throughout Canada on December 2, in advance of its television broadcast on December 17 on CBC Television and CBC Gem.

References

External links

2021 films
2021 documentary films
Canadian documentary television films
Documentary films about singers
CBC Television original films
Documentary films about women in music
2020s English-language films
2020s Canadian films